2000 Continental Championships may refer to:

African Championships
 Multisport: 2000 African Cup of Nations

Asian Championships
 Athletics: 2000 Asian Athletics Championships
 Football (soccer): 2000 AFC Asian Cup
 Football (soccer): Asian Club Championship 1999-2000

European Championships
 Athletics: 2000 European Indoor Championships in Athletics
 Figure Skating: 2000 European Figure Skating Championships
 Football (soccer): 1999–2000 UEFA Champions League
 Football (soccer): 1999–2000 UEFA Cup
 Football (soccer): UEFA Euro 2000

Oceanian Championships
 Football (soccer): 2000 OFC Nations Cup
 Swimming: 2000 Oceania Swimming Championships

Pan American Championships / North American Championships
 Football (soccer): CONCACAF Champions' Cup 2000

South American Championships
 Football (soccer): Copa Libertadores 2000

See also
 2000 World Championships (disambiguation)
 2000 World Junior Championships (disambiguation)
 2000 World Cup (disambiguation)
 Continental championship (disambiguation)

 Continental championships